Borderers can mean any of the following:

 Those in the United Kingdom who live in the Anglo-Scottish or Anglo-Welsh borders.
 The Borderers, a British television historical drama series based on life in the Scottish Middle March on the frontier between England and Scotland.
 Border_Reivers#Borderers_as_soldiers, persons, some or many who may have been Border Reivers, from the Anglo-Scottish border area recruited into various militaries of the British Isles
 UK military units
 King's Own Scottish Borderers, UK Army unit drawn from the Anglo-Scottish border area
 Royal Scots Borderers, UK Army unit drawn from the Anglo-Scottish border area
 South Wales Borderers, UK Army unit drawn from the Anglo-Welsh border area
 Scotch-Irish Americans, referred to as Borderers by some scholars

Infantry